Pasta â Paolina is a pasta dish originating from Palermo, Sicily. It was invented by a friar at the Monastery of San Francesco di Paola. Friars avoid meat consumption due to their traditional vow of poverty, so this dish is pescatarian and utilizes minimal ingredients. Traditionally it used bucatini but now spaghetti is often used. It is made with anchovies, garlic, a small amount of chopped tomato, cinnamon, cloves, almonds, fresh basil and breadcrumbs.

See also

List of Sicilian dishes
List of pasta dishes

References

Cuisine of Sicily
Palermitan cuisine
Pasta dishes